Active Advance Pro Wrestling (2AW) is a Japanese professional wrestling promotion and training facility originally owned and promoted by Taka Michinoku. The promotion places emphasis on a style of puroresu that combines high-flying, technical wrestling, and martial arts. The promotion was originally called Kaientai Dojo (or K-DOJO for short).

This style was largely contributed to by Taka Michinoku and is gaining popularity in Japan and abroad. K-DOJO is also heavily influenced by American-style wrestling and places a large amount of importance on presentation. For instance, each Club-K 3000 show that K-DOJO runs is equipped with a large screen near the entrance gate, similar to the Titantron, where a short introductory vignette is played during each wrestler's entrance and where the crowd can follow the action on-screen.

They had a home building that doubles as their training facility, Chiba Blue Field, where all of their Club-K 3000 shows were held; in December 2011, the building was bought by the joshi pro-wrestling promotion Universal Woman's Pro Wrestling Reina, but K-Dojo continues to run shows from the renamed Reina Arena. On April 1, 2013, the arena was again renamed Blue Field.

History
Kaientai Dojo originated in 2000 as a small wrestling school in Puerto Rico run by Taka Michinoku. After Taka returned to Japan in 2002, he established the Japanese branch of Kaientai Dojo, which would soon become a wrestling promotion. The small federation grew over the years and is now an independent league that runs as a promotion, wrestling school, and talent loan organization to various other leagues such as AJPW, Dragon Gate and Michinoku Pro.

Until recently, K-DOJO was separated into two distinct sides, GET and RAVE, which ran separate shows but often joined together during large shows and tours. GET was led by Taka Michinoku while RAVE's leader was Hi69. After Hi69's departure, Taka Michinoku became commissioner of RAVE, and 296 became commissioner of GET. On April 22, 2007, RAVE ran its last show; the two brands merged and now run joint shows.

A particular aspect of K-DOJO is that it is one of the few wrestling promotions to feature both men and women. Women can wrestle in the same ring as men, either during mixed tag matches or even singles matches. Also, they can challenge for championship belts, something that would be unheard of in most wrestling promotions.

In November 2018, it became known that Taka Michinoku had an eight-year-long extramarital relationship with a woman. After this scandal, the promotion fired him and sanctioned him for one year without payment.

In April 2019, the promotion announced that they were rebranding as Active Advance Pro Wrestling (2AW for short). This came as the company attempted to rebrand itself after the Taka Michinoku scandal, also changing its colors to black & white. That same night, young wrestler Ayato Yoshida won the Strongest-K Championship, symbolically leading the company into the future.

On January 10, 2020, it was announced that 2AW is now part of the Allied Independent Wrestling Federations as their Japanese affiliate.

Roster

Championships

Current

Formerly promoted

2AW Openweight Championship

The 2AW Openweight Championship is a professional wrestling world championship created and promoted by the Japanese promotion Active Advance Pro Wrestling. There have been a total of seven reigns shared between six different champions. The current champion is Ayato Yoshida who is in his second reign.

Combined reigns

{| class="wikitable sortable" style="text-align:center"
!Rank
!Wrestler
!No. ofreigns
!Combineddefenses
!data-sort-type="number"|Combineddays
|-
!1
|style="background-color:#FFE6BD"| Ayato Yoshida † || 2 || 8 || +
|-
!2
| Kengo Mashimo || 1 || 7 || 279
|-
!3
| Shu Asakawa || 1 || 4 || 206
|-
!4
| Taishi Takizawa || 1 || 4 || 182
|-
!5
| Shigehiro Irie || 1 || 3 || 144
|-
!6
| Yuji Okabayashi || 1 || 2 || 102

2AW Tag Team Championship

The 2AW Tag Team Championship is a professional wrestling tag team championship created and promoted by the Japanese promotion Active Advance Pro Wrestling. There have been a total of eleven reigns shared between ten different teams consisting of fifteen distinctive champions. The current title holders are Takuro Niki and Tatsuya Hanami who are in their first reign as a team.

Combined reigns

{| class="wikitable sortable" style="text-align: center"
!Rank
!Team
!No. ofreigns
!Combineddefenses
!Combineddays
|-
!1
| Kengo Mashimo & Tatsuya Hanami || 2 || 8 || 285
|-
!2
|style="background-color:#FFE6BD"| Koen † || 1 || 3 || +
|-
!3
| The Rule || 1 || 2 || 154
|-
!4
| The Andrew Kingdom || 1 || 1 || 107
|-
!5
| The Rule || 1 || 3 || 101
|-
!6
| Toll Glänz  || 1 || 2 || 77
|-
!7
| Chango & Kaji Tomato || 1 || 3 || 76
|-
!8
| Tempest || 1 || 0 || 54
|-
!9
| Voodoo Murders || 1 || 0 || 46
|-
!10
| Ayato Yoshida & Tank Nagai || 1 || 0 || 40
|-

By wrestler

{|class="wikitable sortable" style="text-align: center"
!Rank
!Wrestler
!data-sort-type="number"|No. ofreigns
!data-sort-type="number"|Combineddefenses
!data-sort-type="number"|Combineddays	
|-
!1
|style="background-color:#FFE6BD"| Tatsuya Hanami † || 3 || 11 || +
|-
!2
| Ayato Yoshida || 3 || 5 || 296
|-
!3
| Kengo Mashimo || 2 || 8 || 285
|-
!4
| The Andrew King Takuma || 2 || 4 || 208
|-
!5
|style="background-color:#FFE6BD"| Takuro Niki † || 1 || 3 || +
|-
!6
| Excilio || 1 || 2 || 154
|-
!7
| Tank Nagai || 2 || 2 || 117
|-
!8
| Shigehiro Irie || 1 || 1 || 107
|-
!9
| Kotaro Yoshino || 1 || 2 || 77
|-
!rowspan=2|10
| Chango || 1 || 3 || 76
|-
| Kaji Tomato || 1 || 3 || 76
|-
!rowspan=2|12
| Ayumu Honda || 1 || 0 || 54
|-
| Taishi Takizawa || 1 || 0 || 54
|-
!rowspan=2|14
| Chris Vice || 1 || 0 || 46
|-
| Yoshikazu Yokoyama || 1 || 0 || 46
|-

Defunct

Annual tournaments

See also

Professional wrestling in Japan
List of professional wrestling promotions in Japan

References

External links

2AW Official Site (Japanese)
K-DOJO Official Site (Japanese)
 K-DOJO Fan Site (English)
K-DOJO Fan Site (Japanese)

 
Professional wrestling schools
2002 establishments in Japan
Dōjō